Mark Kavanagh (born 1997) is an Irish hurler who plays for Laois Senior Championship club Rathdowney–Errill and at inter-county level with the Laois senior hurling team. He usually lines out as a full-forward.

Career statistics

Honours

Rathdowney-Errill
Laois Senior Hurling Championship (1): 2014

References

External links
Mark Kavanagh profile at the Laois GAA website

1997 births
Living people
Rathdowney-Errill hurlers
Laois inter-county hurlers